Roscoe Wayne Marquand (born August 22, 1981) is an American actor. He has played Aaron on the television series The Walking Dead (2015–2022),  Red Skull and Ultron in various projects connected to the Marvel Cinematic Universe, and has voiced numerous characters on the streaming television series Invincible (2021).

Early life
Marquand was born in Fort Collins, Colorado. His initial foray into acting began at the age of nine when he played a small part in a church play. Soon thereafter, he joined the Boy Scouts of America (where he attained the rank of Eagle Scout) and began impersonating celebrities at campfire ceremonies.

While in attendance at the University of Colorado at Boulder, Marquand starred in several productions including To Kill a Mockingbird, The Passion of Dracula, and The Cherry Orchard. He graduated with a BFA (Bachelor of Fine Arts) in Theatre Performance.

Career
After college he moved to Los Angeles and quickly garnered attention in several film and television projects. He played a crooked cop with entertaining gusto in The Sabi Company's Down and Dangerous (2013). Marquand portrayed screen legend Paul Newman on AMC's Mad Men. Marquand is best known for the recurring role of Aaron on The Walking Dead, the popular TV series' first gay male character.

Since 2018, he has portrayed and voiced two characters in the Marvel Cinematic Universe: Red Skull in the films Avengers: Infinity War (2018) and Avengers: Endgame (2019), as well as Ultron in the virtual reality experience Avengers: Damage Control (2019) and as an alternate version of the character in the film Doctor Strange in the Multiverse of Madness (2022), replacing Hugo Weaving and James Spader. Marquand voiced both characters in the television series What If...? (2021).

An accomplished voiceover actor, Ross has lent his talents to productions such as Phineas and Ferb, Conan, and video games like Battlefield Hardline. He is also known for impersonating a plethora of celebrities including Michael Caine, Sylvester Stallone, Matthew McConaughey and over 50 others. This expertise led to a starring and producing role on Pop TV's Impress Me, helmed by Ben Shelton and Rainn Wilson.

Filmography

Film

Television

Video games

Theme parks

Podcasts

Awards and nominations

References

External links

 
 

Living people
American impressionists (entertainers)
American male television actors
Actors from Fort Collins, Colorado
University of Colorado Boulder alumni
American male film actors
Male actors from Denver
21st-century American male actors
American male stage actors
American male voice actors
21st-century American comedians
1981 births